Alireza Ali Ahmadi  (born 11 May 1959 in Isfahan) is an Iranian politician and former Minister of Education from 2008 to 2009. Before his appointment as Minister of Education, he was Chancellor of Payame Noor University. He was also proposed Minister of Commerce in Mahmoud Ahmadinejad's first cabinet which he was not confirmed by the Iranian Parliament. He was one of the candidates in 2013 presidential election but was withdrawn on 21 May.

References

1959 births
Living people
Politicians from Isfahan
Education ministers of Iran
YEKTA Front politicians
Society of Devotees of the Islamic Revolution politicians
Iranian industrial engineers
Alliance of Builders of Islamic Iran politicians
Academic staff of Payame Noor University
20th-century Iranian engineers
21st-century Iranian politicians